Johnny 'Gyro' Potter is an American martial arts instructor, and former competitive karate fighter. He holds black belts in Taekwondo, Kung Fu, Hapkido, Karate, Aikido, and Judo. He started training under Chuck Norris in the art of Taekwondo at the Sherman Oaks Karate School in Los Angeles, California; and earned his first Black Belt in 1978.

Career 
In 1985, Potter was named “Fighter of the Year” by Martial Arts Magazine and in 1990 was inducted into the IFKA Hall of Fame with their title of “Competitor of the Year”.  He was ranked as the top competitor in Region 2 (California and Nevada) by Karate Illustrated Magazine and Martial Arts Magazine from 1982-1987.

Recognitions 
He was ranked as the top fighter in the Professional Karate League (PKL) and in the California Karate League (CKL). He was ranked #18 in 1983 nationally, #10 in 1985 by Karate Illustrated Magazine, and #6 in 1986 in the United States by the NAKC. In the AAU taekwondo competition, Johnny Gyro was rated #1 in 1983 in Men’s Fighting Region 2, California and Nevada.

He appeared as "Johnny Gyro" on the covers of at least 8 martial arts magazines.

References

External links
 Johnny Gyro Karate - Official Site

American male karateka
American hapkido practitioners
American tang soo do practitioners
American wushu practitioners
Year of birth missing (living people)
Living people